István Gorove de Gáttája (20 August 1819 in Pest – 31 May 1881 in Budapest) was a Hungarian politician with Armenian ancestry. He was leader of the Liberal Party, which controlled Hungary between 1875 and 1905. Gorove was a minister in Count Gyula Andrássy's cabinet: Minister of Agriculture, Industry and Trade between 1867 and 1870, and Minister of Public Works and Transport until 1871.

References

Hungarian nobility
Agriculture ministers of Hungary
Public Works and Transport ministers of Hungary
People from Pest, Hungary
1819 births
1881 deaths